Qamcheqay (also Romanized as Qamcheqāy and Qamcheqā’ī; also known as Ghamchaghay, Kabajgāi, and Qamchāy) is a village in Shivanat Rural District, Afshar District, Khodabandeh County, Zanjan Province, Iran. At the 2006 census, its population was 404, in 80 families.

References 

Populated places in Khodabandeh County